Estadio Jaraguay (known as Estadio Municipal de Montería until December 2015) is a multi-use stadium in Montería, Colombia. It is currently used mostly for football matches. The stadium was built in 2012 for the National Games of Colombia, with a capacity of 8,000 people, which was raised by 4,000 seats in 2017 with the construction of a new grandstand. Jaguares de Córdoba play their home matches at this stadium. In December 2015, the stadium was renamed to Jaraguay after the name was chosen from a list provided by citizens in a contest organized through the website of the Municipality of Montería. Jaraguay was a Zenú Cacique who ruled in what is now Montería.

References

Football venues in Colombia